Sir Walter Erle or Earle (22 November 1586 – 1 September 1665) was an English landowner and politician who sat in the House of Commons at various times between 1614 and 1648. He was a vigorous opponent of King Charles I in the Parliamentary cause both before and during the English Civil War.

Early life
Erle was the son of Thomas Erle of Charborough in Dorset and his wife Dorothy Pole, daughter of William Pole of Columpton, Devon. He inherited the estate Charborough at the age of 11 on the death of his father. He matriculated at Queen's College, Oxford on 22 January 1602 aged 15. In 1604 he became a student of Inner Temple.

In 1614, Erle was elected Member of Parliament for Poole. He was knighted on 4 May 1616, and in 1618 served as High Sheriff of Dorset. Like many of the other leading citizens of Dorset, he was an early investor in projects to colonise New England. He and his brother Christopher were both shareholders in the Virginia Company in 1620, and he attended the meeting of that company on 21 May 1621. He was a friend of John White and became a founder member of the Dorchester Company, being described as "Governor of the New England Plantation".

Parliament and imprisonment
In 1621 Erle was re-elected MP for Poole and was elected again in 1624 and 1625.  He was also one of the Justices of Peace for Dorset. In 1625, he was elected MP for Lyme Regis. Parliament was dissolved without voting subsidies to the Crown, and the King attempted to shore up the governmental finances by imposing forced loans on the gentry. Erle was one of the four men in Dorset who refused to pay and as a result he was summoned before the Council, and imprisoned for almost a year in the Fleet Prison before he was able to obtain a writ of habeas corpus. On hearing the case, the judges upheld the prisoners' right to be released, setting a major legal precedent in the restriction of the Crown's autocratic powers. His brother Christopher took his seat at Lyme Regis in 1628.

Short and Long parliaments
After King Charles ruled without parliament for eleven years, Erle was elected MP for Lyme Regis in the Short Parliament in April 1640. On the day after the dissolution of Parliament, he was one of the six men arrested on the King's orders under suspicion of treasonable correspondence with the Scots, with whom England was by this time at war. In November 1640, Erle was returned as MP for Weymouth and Melcombe Regis for the Long Parliament, and was appointed one of the managers of the prosecution in the impeachment of Strafford, but entrusted with proving the charge that Strafford had plotted to bring over the Irish army to suppress unrest in England he bungled his case so that the hearing was at first adjourned on the grounds that the "evidence was not ready" and then the article was in effect dropped altogether. This failure may have contributed significantly to the decision to abandon legal process and proceed against Strafford by Act of Attainder.

Civil War
On the outbreak of the Civil War, Erle became a Colonel in the Parliamentary army. He succeeded John Pym as Lieutenant of the Ordnance in 1643, and was also appointed military governor of Dorchester. However, when he led his forces to besiege Corfe Castle in 1643 he was repulsed after six weeks having lost a hundred men, and he fled Dorchester by sea at the approach of a superior Royal army under Lord Carnarvon. In 1645 he received the thanks of the Commons for deciphering some intercepted letters, and the following year was one of the four commissioners sent to negotiate peace with the King. He continued to sit in Parliament until 1648, when he was excluded in Pride's Purge.

Later parliamenary career
Erle was returned as MP for Dorset in 1654 for the First Protectorate Parliament and in 1659 for the Second Protectorate Parliament. In April 1660, he was elected again as MP for Poole in the Convention Parliament.

Erle died at the age of 78.

Family
Erle married Ann Dymoke daughter of Francis Dymoke, and sister of Sir Henry Dymoke, and through her acquired the manors of Erckington and Pipe, Warwickshire, which he sold to Sir Walter Devereux, Bt. Their son Thomas was also an MP in the Long Parliament with his father, and the latter's son, also called Thomas was a distinguished general.

References

First Earl of Birkenhead, "The trial of Thomas Wentworth, Earl of Strafford" in Famous Trials (London: Hutchinson & Co, no date)
 C.V. Wedgwood, The King's Peace, 1637-1641 (London: Collins Fontana, 1971)

External links
Biography of Sir Walter Erle at freepages.genealogy.rootsweb.ancestry.com

 

1586 births
1665 deaths
Military personnel from Dorset
High Sheriffs of Dorset
Inmates of Fleet Prison
Roundheads
Politicians from Dorset
English MPs 1614
English MPs 1621–1622
English MPs 1624–1625
English MPs 1625
English MPs 1640 (April)
English MPs 1640–1648
English MPs 1654–1655
English MPs 1659
English MPs 1660